Francisco Sanchez may refer to:

Sportspeople
Francisco Sánchez (swimmer) (born 1976), Venezuelan who swam at the 1996 and 2000 Summer Olympics
Francisco Sánchez (runner) (born 1958), Spanish steeplechase runner
Francisco Sánchez (boxer) (born 1956), Dominican Republic boxer
Francisco Sánchez (wrestler, born 1970) (born 1970), Spanish wrestler who competed at the 1992 Olympics
Francisco Sánchez (wrestler, born 1979) (born 1979), Spanish wrestler who competed at the 2008 Olympics
Francisco Sánchez (footballer) (born 1985), Chilean football midfielder
Francisco Sánchez (volleyball) (born 1960), Spanish former volleyball player
Francisco Sanchez d'Avolio (born 1986), Belgium footballer (soccer player)
Francisco Sánchez Rojas, Chilean footballer
Francisco Javier Sánchez (born 1973), Mexican football player
 Francisco Sánchez Lara (born 1989), Spanish wheelchair basketball player

Others
Francisco Sanchez (politician) (1805–1862), alcalde (mayor) in 1843 San Francisco, California
Francisco Sánchez Gomes (1947–2014), see Paco de Lucía, Spanish guitarist/composer
Francisco Sánchez Chamuscado (1512–1582), Spanish conquistador of New Mexico
Francisco Sánchez (c. 1550–1623), Spanish-Portuguese philosopher and physician
Francisco Sanchez (sailor) (born 1965), known as Kiko Sánchez
Frank Sánchez (lawyer) (Francisco Sanchez, born 1959), United States Under Secretary for International Trade
Joaquin Francisco Sanchez (born 1962), known as Keno, Filipino singer, actor writer
Francisco Sanchez, suspect in the Shooting of Kathryn Steinle